Siddharth Chowdhury is an  Indian novelist. He lives in Delhi where, until recently, he worked with a publishing company. He began writing at 19, "Rather late", he says, "most writers seem to start at 10 or earlier" but was soon publishing short stories in Indian and foreign publications.

Biography

Writing career 
Chowdhury grew up in Patna. His first collection of stories, Diksha at St Martins, appeared two years ago to immense praise. He is the author of Diksha at St. Martin's, Patna Roughcut and Day Scholar, which was shortlisted for the Man Asian Literary Prize 2009. He read English Literature at Delhi University (1993–98). In 2007, he held the Charles Wallace Writer in Residence fellowship at the University of Stirling in Scotland. Part of Day Scholar was written there. He lives in Delhi and works as Editorial Consultant with the house of Manohar.

Notable works 
Diksha at St. Martin's (2002), Sristhi Publication
Patna Roughcut (2005), Picador India
Day Scholar (2010), Picador Indial
A Patna Manual of Style  (2015) Aleph Books

Award 
The Man Asian Literary Prize in 2009

References 

Living people
English-language writers from India
Indian male novelists
Writers from Patna
1974 births
20th-century Indian novelists
Novelists from Bihar
20th-century Indian male writers